Elsa Daniel born Elsa Nilda Gómez Scapatti (13 November 1936 – 25 June 2017) was an Argentine film actress. She entered film in the 1954 classic The Grandfather and made some 30 appearances in film between then and 1987.

Daniel, a blonde, played ingenues in many of Leopoldo Torre Nilsson's masterpieces such as La Casa del ángel, La Caída, and La Mano en la trampa. She was shortly married to director Rodolfo Khun, who directed her in the film Los Inconstantes. She retired from cinema in 1987.

Death
Elsa Daniel died on 25 June 2017, aged 80.

Partial filmography
 The Grandfather (1954)
 El Juramento de Lagardere (1955)
 Graciela (1956)
 La Casa del ángel (1957)
 Un centavo de mujer (1958)
 Isla brava (1958)
 La Caída (1959)
 La Mano en la trampa (1961)
 La Novia(1962)
 The Dragonfly Is Not an Insect (1963)
 El Romance del Aniceto y la Francisca (1967)
 Ufa con el sexo (1968)
 Amor y un poco más (1968)
 Amalio Reyes, un hombre (1970)
 Broken Comedy (1978)

References

External links

 

1936 births
2017 deaths
Argentine film actresses
People from San Lorenzo Department